The 1987 IBF World Championships (World Badminton Championships) were held in Beijing, China, in 1987.

Venue
Capitol Sports Hall

Medalists

Medal table

Medalists

External links
 1987 IBF World Championships Results
Badminton.de: IBF World Championships Men's singles draw

 
IBF World Championships
IBF World Championships
1987
BWF World Championships
IBF World Championships
IBF World Championships
IBF World Championships
IBF World Championships